The Bell of Cheonheungsa is from the Cheonheungsa Temple near Seonggeo Mountain in Chungcheongnam-do Province. The Bell of Cheonheungsa is regarded as one of the largest and most beautiful bells from the Goryeo period.
The bell is listed at number 280 in the "National Treasures of South Korea" list. It is made from bronze and has a height of 1.33m, with a bell inlet of 0.96m.

See also
 Culture of Korea
 Korean Art
 Bell of King Seongdeok
 Bell of Yongjusa
 Bell of Sangwonsa

References

Individual bells
Korean art
National Treasures of South Korea